Sleeping Beauty is a Finnish family fantasy film made in 1949, directed by Edvin Laine and produced by T. J. Särkkä. The title part of the film is played by Tuula Usva, the king is played by the director's brother Aarne Laine and the queen is played by the director's wife Mirjam Novero. The film is based on Sleeping Beauty by the Brothers Grimm and also the play written by Zachris Topelius based on the Grimm's fairy tale.

Leo Lehto won the 1949 Jussi Awards category of the best scenery.

References

External links
 

1949 films
Finnish fantasy films
Films based on Sleeping Beauty
Finnish films based on plays
Films directed by Edvin Laine